The 2021–22 season was Walsall's 134th year in their history and third consecutive season in League Two. Along with the league, the club competed in the FA Cup, the EFL Cup and the EFL Trophy. The season covers the period from 1 July 2021 to 30 June 2022.

Pre-season friendlies
Walsall announced they would play friendlies against Leamington, Crystal Palace, Aston Villa, Kidderminster Harriers, West Bromwich Albion and Cheltenham Town as part of the pre-season preparations.

Competitions

League Two

League table

Results summary

Results by matchday

Matches
The Saddlers league fixtures were released on 24 June 2021.

FA Cup

Walsall were drawn away to King's Lynn Town in the first round and at home to Swindon Town in the second round.

EFL Cup

EFL Trophy

Saddlers were drawn into Southern Group D alongside Forest Green Rovers and Northampton Town. Group stage ties were confirmed on 1 July.

Transfers

Transfers in

Loans in

Loans out

Transfers out

References

Walsall
Walsall F.C. seasons